In statistics, a symmetric probability distribution is a probability distribution—an assignment of probabilities to possible occurrences—which is unchanged when its probability density function (for continuous probability distribution) or probability mass function (for discrete random variables) is reflected around a vertical line at some value of the random variable represented by the distribution. This vertical line is the line of symmetry of the distribution. Thus the probability of being any given distance on one side of the value about which symmetry occurs is the same as the probability of being the same distance on the other side of that value.

Formal definition

A probability distribution is said to be symmetric if and only if there exists a value  such that

 for all real numbers 

where f is the probability density function if the distribution is continuous or the probability mass function if the distribution is discrete.

Multivariate distributions

The degree of symmetry, in the sense of mirror symmetry, can be evaluated quantitatively for multivariate distributions with the chiral index, which takes values in the interval [0;1], and which is null if and only if the distribution is mirror symmetric.
Thus, a d-variate distribution is defined to be mirror symmetric when its chiral index is null.
The distribution can be discrete or continuous, and the existence of a density is not required, but the inertia must be finite and non null.
In the univariate case, this index was proposed as a non parametric test of symmetry.

For continuous symmetric spherical, Mir M. Ali gave the following definition. Let  denote the class of spherically symmetric distributions of the absolutely continuous type in the n-dimensional Euclidean space having joint density of the form inside a sphere with center at the origin with a prescribed radius which may be finite or infinite and zero elsewhere.

Properties
 The median and the mean (if it exists) of a symmetric distribution both occur at the point  about which the symmetry occurs.
 If a symmetric distribution is unimodal, the mode coincides with the median and mean.
 Every measure of skewness equals zero for a symmetric distribution.

Unimodal case

Partial list of examples

The following distributions are symmetric for all parametrizations. (Many other distributions are symmetric for a particular parametrization.)

References